Acalolepta tincturata is a species of beetle in the family Cerambycidae. It was described by Francis Polkinghorne Pascoe in 1866. It is known from Papua New Guinea and Indonesia. It feeds on Hevea brasiliensis, Pinus patula, Spathodea campanulata, Araucaria cunninghamii, and Plumeria acutifolia.

References

Acalolepta
Beetles described in 1866
Taxa named by Francis Polkinghorne Pascoe